Tandi Dorji (Wylie : Rta mgrin rdo rje; born 2 September 1968) is a Bhutanese politician who has been Foreign Minister for Bhutan since November 2018. He has been a member of the National Assembly of Bhutan, since October 2018.

Education
He holds a Bachelor of Medicine and Bachelor of Surgery degree from Mymensingh Medical College under the University of Dhaka, Bangladesh. He completed his Master of International Public Health from University of Sydney, Australia and Master of Business Administration from University of Canberra, Australia.

Political career
Before entering politics, he was a pediatrician, public health researcher and a technical advisor.

Dorji is a founding member and former president of the Druk Nyamrup Tshogpa. 
He participated in the 2008 and 2013 elections. He was elected to the National Assembly of Bhutan in the 2018 elections for the Lingmukha Toedwang constituency. He received 3,154 votes and defeated Sonam Wangyel Wang, a candidate of DPT.

On 3 November, Lotay Tshering formally announced his cabinet structure and Tandi was named as Foreign Minister for Bhutan. On 7 November 2018, he was sworn in as Foreign Minister for Bhutan in the cabinet of Prime Minister Lotay Tshering.

Honours
  :
  The Royal Orange Scarf (3 November 2018).
  The Royal Red Scarf (17 December 2022).

References 

1968 births
Living people
Foreign ministers of Bhutan
Bhutanese MNAs 2018–2023
Bhutanese pediatricians
Lotay Tshering ministry
Druk Nyamrup Tshogpa politicians
University of Dhaka alumni
University of Sydney alumni
University of Canberra alumni
Druk Nyamrup Tshogpa MNAs